New Adana Stadium is a football-specific stadium in the Sarıçam district of Adana, Turkey. The stadium has a capacity of 33,543 spectators, fully seated and all sheltered. The stadium was inaugurated on 19 February 2021.

See also
List of football stadiums in Turkey

References

Football venues in Turkey
Sport venues in Adana
Adana Demirspor
Buildings and structures in Adana
Sports venues completed in 2021
2021 establishments in Turkey